Vedernikov (masculine) or Vedernikova (feminine) is a Russian surname. Notable people with the surname include:

Alexander Vedernikov (1964–2020), Russian conductor
Alexander Vedernikov (bass) (1927–2018), Soviet Russian opera singer and music educator
Andrei Vedernikov (born 1959), Russian Olympic cyclist

See also
7996 Vedernikov, a main-belt asteroid

Russian-language surnames